The Hakim Rifle is a gas operated semi-automatic rifle.  It was originally designed by Sweden and produced as the Ag m/42 for the Swedish Army.  The tooling and design were later sold to Egypt, and the Hakim was produced there during the 1950s and early 1960s. It was replaced in the mid-1960s by the Maadi AK-47 (a licensed copy of the Soviet rifle) but was stored in military reserve arsenals. In more recent years, it has been observed in use by some Egyptian police units. Around 70,000 were made.

A shortened carbine version of this rifle called the Rasheed Carbine was manufactured in limited numbers in Egypt using the smaller 7.62x39mm cartridge.

Due to its age, the Hakim is designated as a Curio and Relic firearm by the United States Bureau of Alcohol, Tobacco, Firearms and Explosives.

Design
Egypt introduced an adjustable gas operated system, whereas the Ag m/42 had been non-adjustable. The Hakim system is adjustable by use of a special tool and is a simple, direct impingement type whereby the flow of gas impacts directly on the front face of the bolt carrier, propelling it to the rear, which unlocks and moves the bolt as it does so. The Hakim features a Tokarev-pattern tipping bolt system as used in the FN-49, SKS and MAS-49 rifles.

While the Ag m/42 fired the 6.5×55mm cartridge, Egypt owned large stockpiles of 8×57mm Mauser ammunition, much of it left behind from World War II. To take advantage of the large stockpile, the Hakim was further re-engineered to accept the larger cartridge, which also necessitated the addition of a permanent, non removable muzzle brake to help reduce the concurrent greater recoil. Some internet sites have incorrectly referred to this as a flash suppressor; the two are distinctly different features that serve entirely different functions: a muzzle brake is designed to reduce recoil (thereby reducing stress on the operator, as well as wear on the rifle itself), whereas a flash suppressor is designed to reduce the bright muzzle flash so that it does not blind the operator when firing in dark conditions.

The Hakim features a 10-round magazine intended to be loaded from the top breech with 5-round stripper clips.

References

External links
 Hakim Operation and Maintenance Manual
 Differences between the AG42 and the Hakim

7.92×57mm Mauser semi-automatic rifles
Weapons of Egypt
Rifles of the Cold War
Military equipment introduced in the 1950s
Infantry weapons of the Cold War
Egypt–Sweden relations